Sujoy Ghosh is an Indian film director, actor, producer, and screenwriter who works in Hindi films. He has directed Jhankaar Beats (2003), Home Delivery: Aapko... Ghar Tak (2005), Aladin (2009), Kahaani (2012), Kahaani 2 (2016) and Badla (2019). He has also written and directed short films like Anukul (2017) and Ahalya (2015). He has directed a series for Netflix, titled Typewriter (2019).

Early life
Sujoy Ghosh was born in Kolkata. He studied in St. James' School. He used to stay in Bhowanipore and then moved to London when he was 13. Sujoy attended Queen Elizabeth Sixth Form College where he completed his A Levels. He has a degree in engineering and an MBA from Manchester University. He worked as a South Asia head of the media division of Reuters before quitting in 1999. Sujoy is married to Vaishali – a psychologist and has two children Diya – a fellow film director and Agni – an ex professional rugby player, who now works for Phaidon International.

Career
Ghosh made his directorial debut in 2003 with the small-budget Jhankaar Beats which was a tribute to R. D. Burman, and which went on to become a surprise hit. His next ventures Home Delivery and Aladin did not achieve box office success. His 2012 release Kahaani, featuring Vidya Balan in lead role, has gained both widespread commercial success and critical acclaim. In 2016, his film Kahaani 2 was released which is a sequel to Kahaani. He started his acting career portraying the role of Bengali sleuth Byomkesh Bakshi in a film directed by Rituparno Ghosh in December 2012. Not many know that he has written the tagline "Korbo Lorbo Jeetbo Re" for the IPL Team Kolkata Knight Riders. He has also directed, produced and written short films like Anukul (2017) and Ahalya (2015).

Filmography

Awards

References

External links

Living people
21st-century Indian film directors
Indian male screenwriters
Film directors from Kolkata
Bengali film directors
Hindi-language film directors
Alumni of the University of Manchester
Best Original Screenplay National Film Award winners
1966 births